Mariana Valverde  is a Canadian criminologist and sociologist. She is currently a professor in the Centre for Criminology and Sociolegal Studies at the University of Toronto. Her research mainly focuses on the sociology of law. She is also an occasional contributor to Spacing magazine.

In 2000 Mariana Valverde won the Herbert Jacob book prize from the Law and Society Association for her book Diseases of the Will: Alcohol and the Dilemmas of Freedom (Cambridge University Press, 1998).

Mariana Valverde is the daughter of Spanish poet and philosopher José María Valverde.

Selected works
Valverde, Mariana. (1991). The Age of Light, Soap, and Water: Moral Reform in English Canada 1880s-1920s. Toronto: University of Toronto Press.
Valverde, Mariana. (1998). Diseases of the Will: Alcohol and the Dilemmas of Freedom. Cambridge: Cambridge University Press.
Valverde, Mariana. (2003). Law’s Dream of a Common Knowledge. Princeton University Press.
Valverde, Mariana. (2006). Law and Order: Signs,  Meanings, Myths. Routledge. 
Valverde, Mariana. (2012). Everyday law on the Street: City Governance in an Age of Diversity. Chicago University Press.

References

External links
 

Year of birth missing (living people)
Brock University alumni
Canadian criminologists
Canadian feminists
Canadian sociologists
Canadian women non-fiction writers
Fellows of the Royal Society of Canada
Living people
Academic staff of Trent University
Academic staff of the University of Toronto
Canadian women sociologists
York University alumni
Academic staff of York University
Canadian women criminologists